This is a list of the albums ranked number one in the United States during 2022. The top-performing albums and EPs in the U.S. are ranked on the Billboard 200 chart, which is published by Billboard magazine. The data is compiled by Nielsen SoundScan based on multi-metric consumption as measured in album-equivalent units, which comprise album sales, track sales, and streams on digital music platforms. Each unit equals one album sold, or 10 individual digital tracks sold from an album, or 3,750 ad-supported or 1,250 paid/subscription on-demand official audio and video streams generated by songs from an album.

Having topped the chart for thirteen non-consecutive weeks, Bad Bunny's Un Verano Sin Ti is the longest-reigning number-one album of 2022, and tied the Frozen soundtrack (2013) and Drake's Views (2016) for the most weeks at number one in the last 10 years. The soundtrack of Disney's 2021 animated musical film, Encanto, marked the sixth time in history an animated film's soundtrack reached number one on the Billboard 200, following The Lion King (1994), Pocahontas (1995), Curious George (2006), Frozen and Frozen II (2019).

Taylor Swift's tenth studio album, Midnights, opened with 1.578 million units, marking the largest opening week for an album in the last seven years. It instantly became the fastest and best-selling album of 2022, and the biggest selling since Swift's own Reputation (2017); Swift also became the first artist in history to score 11 consecutive number-one debuts on the Billboard 200 chart. Born Pink, the second studio album by South Korean girl group Blackpink, marked the first number-one album on the Billboard 200 by a female group since Danity Kane's second album, Welcome to the Dollhouse (2008). South Korean boy group Stray Kids garnered two number ones on the chart this year, with their EPs Oddinary and Maxident; they became the first act to do so in 2022.

Chart history

See also 
 List of Billboard Hot 100 number ones of 2022
 List of Billboard Global 200 number ones of 2022
 2022 in American music

References

United States Albums
2022